The sixth season of NYPD Blue premiered on ABC on October 20, 1998, and concluded on May 25, 1999.

Cast

Episodes

References

NYPD Blue seasons
1998 American television seasons
1999 American television seasons